Nathaniel Garrow (April 25, 1780 – March 3, 1841) was an American politician who served one term as a U.S. Representative from New York from 1827 to 1829.

Biography 
Born in Barnstable, Massachusetts, Garrow attended the public schools.
Followed the sea.
He moved to Auburn, New York, in 1796.

He was appointed Justice of the Peace in 1809.
Sheriff of Cayuga County 1815–1819 and 1821–1825.

Congress 
Garrow was elected as a Jacksonian to the Twentieth Congress (March 4, 1827 – March 3, 1829).
United States marshal of the northern district of New York from February 1837 to March 1841.

Death 
He died in Auburn, New York, March 3, 1841.
He was interred in the family burying ground on his estate.
He was reinterred in Fort Hill Cemetery, Auburn, New York.

References

1780 births
1841 deaths
United States Marshals
Jacksonian members of the United States House of Representatives from New York (state)
19th-century American politicians
Members of the United States House of Representatives from New York (state)